Michael Colalillo (December 2, 1925 – December 30, 2011) was a United States Army soldier and a recipient of the United States military's highest decorationthe Medal of Honorfor his actions during World War II.

Early life
Colalillo was born on December 1, 1925, in Hibbing, Minnesota to Italian parents who had immigrated to the U.S. shortly before his birth. Colalillo was the eighth of nine children. His family struggled financially through out the years mainly due to the Great Depression. He grew up in a tough neighborhood in western Duluth, Minnesota. In his teenage years, Colalillo attended Denfeld High School but dropped out before graduating in order to help support his family by working at a local bakery after the passing of his mother.

Military service
Colalillo joined the Army from Duluth, Minnesota in February 1944, and was serving as a private first class in Company C, 398th Infantry Regiment, 100th Infantry Division, that was deployed in the Western Allied invasion of Germany. On April 7, 1945, his unit fought Waffen-SS forces in the Battle of Buchhof and Stein am Kocher near Untergriesheim, Germany. Colalillo encouraged his comrades to follow him into enemy fire, manned an exposed machine gun, and helped a wounded soldier back to friendly lines. For his actions during the battle, he was awarded the Medal of Honor on January 9, 1946.

Post military service
After his discharge from the Army, Colalillo moved back to Duluth, Minnesota, where he married Lina Nissila on November 16, 1945. The couple had two daughters and a son. In 1946, Colalillo was employed by the Interlake Iron Company as a coal dump laborer and in 1950 he suffered a serious injury when his hand was caught on a conveyor belt which caused permanent damage, making his hand nearly useless. After his injury, Colalillo worked as a longshoreman, and in 1987, he retired from the Duluth Port Authority.

Death
Colalillo died on December 30, 2011, at the Ecumen Bayshore Care Center. He is buried at Forest Hill Cemetery in Duluth, Minnesota. He was Minnesota's last living Medal of Honor recipient.

Medal of Honor

Awards and decorations
SGT Colalillo was awarded through out his military career the following:

Gallary

See also

 List of Medal of Honor recipients for World War II

References

External links
 
 
 
 
 Home of Heroes profile

1925 births
2011 deaths
People from Hibbing, Minnesota
United States Army personnel of World War II
United States Army Medal of Honor recipients
United States Army soldiers
World War II recipients of the Medal of Honor